Kadhim Finjan al Hammami (born 1 May 1958) is an Iraqi politician who is now the position of the Iraqi Minister of Transport.

Controversial comments 
In 2016, al Hammami caused controversy during an inauguration of an airport in Dhi Qar Governorate, when he said that Sumerians had a port where spaceships could fly to other planets in 5000 BC, based on writings of Zecharia Sitchin, Samuel Noah Kramer and H. G. Wells. Later on, he claimed that Noah's Ark embarked from Nasiriyah.

Specialized certificates 
 Certificate of Maritime Extension (equivalent to Bachelor).
 Bachelor of Science.
 Maritime arbitration certificate from Basra court.

Career progression 
 Work on sea drilling vessels from 1973 to 1975.
 A third naval guide on ships coming to Iraq from 1975 to 1977.
 Second naval guide on ships coming to Iraq from 1977 to 1978.
 First naval guide on ships coming to Iraq from 1978 to 1980.

Academic work 
 Teaching at the Vocational Training Center of the Naval Academy for the period from 1980 to 1988.

Graduation in positions 
 Director of the Scientific Follow-up Unit for the period from 1993 to 1998
 Director of the Marine Inspection Department for the period from 2000 to 2004
 Assistant Director General of Ports for the period from 2004 to 2006
 Director of Khor Al Zubair Port for the period from 2006 to 2007
 He is currently the Director of Maritime Control and Field Officer for the movements of ships and tankers coming and leaving to and from Iraqi ports.

See also
Haider al-Abadi

References

External links
The Iraqi Ministry of Transport

Living people
Government ministers of Iraq
1958 births
People from Basra